Stéphane Simian (born 8 June 1967) is a former professional tennis player from France. He achieved a career-high singles ranking of world No. 41 in 1993 and a career-high doubles ranking of world No. 56 in 1994.

ATP career finals

Singles: 2 (2 runner-ups)

Doubles: 3 (2 titles, 1 runner-up)

ATP Challenger and ITF Futures Finals

Singles: 6 (2–4)

Doubles: 7 (5–2)

Performance timelines

Singles

Doubles

References

External links
 
 

1967 births
Living people
French male tennis players
Sportspeople from Rhône (department)